Buzzy or Buzzie may refer to:

People
Buzzie Bavasi (1914–2008), American Major League Baseball executive
David Busfield (born 1953), English rugby league footballer and coach
Frank Carrone (1938–1975), Italian-American mobster
Buzzy Drootin (1920–2000), legendary jazz drummer
Buzzy Feiten, North American singer-songwriter, guitarist, and session musician
Buzzy Hellring or Bernard Hellring, creator of Ultimate Frisbee
Terry "Buzzy" Johnson (born 1938), American popular music singer, songwriter and music producer
Buzzy Kerbox (born 1956), American 1990s surfer and model
A. B. Krongard (born 1936), appointed executive director of the Central Intelligence Agency in 2001
Buzzy Linhart (born 1943), American rock performer and musician
Ralph Maxwell (athlete) (1919–2014), American judge and Masters track and field athlete
William "Buzzy" McClane, a member of The Cleftones doo-wop singing group
Buzzie Reutimann (born 1941), American former NASCAR driver
Curtis Roosevelt (1930–2016), oldest grandson of Franklin D. and Eleanor Roosevelt, nicknamed "Buzzie" in newspapers
Buzzy Trent (1929–2006), pioneer of big wave surfing
Buzzy Wares (1886–1964), American Major League Baseball shortstop
Buzzy Wilkinson (1932–2016), American former basketball player

Entertainment
"Buzzy" (song), a jazz standard by Charlie Parker
buzzy, and Buzzy (The Black Album), 1969 and 1972 albums by Buzzy Linhart
Buzzy, a black stereotype cartoon character introduced in 1946 – see Herman and Katnip
Buzzy, the title character of Buzzy Boop, 1938 Fleischer Studios animated short film
Buzzy the Knowledge Bug, host of the Junior Field Trips trilogy of children's computer games

Other uses
Buzzy or Buzzy Burr, common name of the plant Acaena magellanica

See also
Buzzy Bee, popular toy in New Zealand
Buzi, the mother or father of the priest Ezekiel in the Bible
Buzy, disambiguation
Buzz (disambiguation)
Buzzi
Buzzie, Character by Chromsmith

Lists of people by nickname